Oleksandr Pavlovych Berdnyk (November 27, 1926, officially December 25, 1927 - March 18, 2003) was a Ukrainian science fiction writer, futurist and globalist, philosopher and theologian, public figure, Red Army soldier during World War II, and a political prisoner in Soviet camps. He wrote more than 20 novels and short stories that have been translated into many languages, including English, German, French, Russian, and Hungarian. He has been described as the most influential classic writer of Ukrainian science fiction.

He was a founding member of the Ukrainian Helsinki Group and a leader of the Ukrainian Humanist Association "Ukrainian Spiritual Republic."

See also 
Ukrainian Helsinki Group
Soviet dissidents
List of Slavic Native Faith's organisations
Slavic Native Faith
Mykhailo Melnyk

References 

1926 births
2003 deaths
Chevaliers of the Order For Courage, 1st class
People of the Revolution on Granite
Ukrainian science fiction writers
Ukrainian fantasy writers
Ukrainian alternate history writers
Ukrainian dissidents
Ukrainian poets
Ukrainian speculative fiction writers
Soviet human rights activists
Cosmists
Transhumanists
Ukrainian philosophers
Theologians